Coppens Corner is an unincorporated community in the Town of Eaton, Brown County, Wisconsin, United States.

It is located at the corner of County Trunk JJ and County Trunk P. The community was named for Phil and Catherine Coppens, who owned land in the area in the 1860s.

Notes

Unincorporated communities in Brown County, Wisconsin
Unincorporated communities in Wisconsin